Little Neon Limelight is the second studio album by American alternative blues band Houndmouth. It was released on March 17, 2015 via Rough Trade Records. Recording sessions took place at Low Country Sound Studios in Nashville, TN.

Background and release
Little Neon Limelight was announced in a press release by Rough Trade Records on January 20, 2015 for release on March 17, 2015. The album was recorded at the Low Country Sound Studios in Nashville, Tennessee with Dave Cobb handling production.

Track listing

Charts

References

External links

2015 albums
Rough Trade Records albums
Albums produced by Dave Cobb